Up to a Certain Point (Spanish: Hasta cierto punto) is a 1983 Cuban movie directed by Tomás Gutiérrez Alea.  It focuses on a theater director who starts up a relationship with a female dockworker.  However, his machismo complicates matters.

The movie is a general look at gender roles in Cuba as well as the conflict between machismo and the idealized image of liberated women under communism.

External links

1983 films
1983 drama films
Cuban drama films
1980s Spanish-language films